Vargas is a Spanish surname of Castilian origin. The founder of the house was Ivan de Vargas who fought as a knight in the reconquest of Madrid, in 1083, at service of Alfonso VI of León and Castile.

Geographical distribution
As of 2014, 22.2% of all known bearers of the surname Vargas were residents of Mexico. Listing of frequency:
Mexico 22.2% (frequency 1:260)
Colombia 15.6% (1:142)
Peru, 7.5% (1:196)
United States, 6.7% (1:2,502)
Bolivia, 6.4% (1:77)
Venezuela, 6.2% (1:225)
Chile, 4.5% (1:183)
Costa Rica, 4.3% (1:51)
Brazil, 4.2% (1:2,249)
Argentina, 3.9% (1:511)
Philippines, 3.2% (1:1,457)
Dominican Republic, 2.7% (1:182)
Spain, 2.5% (1:863)
Ecuador, 2.5% (1:295)
Guatemala, 1.5% (1:498)
Nicaragua, 1.2% (1:237).

In Spain, the frequency of the surname was higher than national average (1:863) in the following autonomous communities:
 1. Andalusia (1:419)
 2. Extremadura (1:445)
 3. Balearic Islands (1:781)
 4. Canary Islands (1:812)
 5. Community of Madrid (1:850)

In Costa Rica, the frequency of the surname was higher than national average (1:51) in the following provinces:
 1. Heredia Province (1:40)
 2. Alajuela Province (1:41)
 3. San José Province (1:49)

Acting
Alfred Vargas, Filipino actor
Elizabeth Vargas, ABC News anchor
Jacob Vargas, Mexican-American actor
Sibila Vargas, CNN reporter
Taliana Vargas, Colombian. First Runner up in Miss Universe 2008.
Valentina Vargas, Chilean actress
Vic Vargas, Filipino, film actor

Finance

Victor Vargas, lawyer and owner of the Banco Occidental de Descuento
Marie Marguerite, Duchess of Anjou, born María Margarita de Vargas y Santaella

Music and arts

Alberto Vargas, Peruvian painter of pin-up girls and erotica
Álvaro Vargas Llosa, Peruvian writer, son of Mario Vargas Llosa
Andrés de Vargas, Spanish painter
Chavela Vargas, Costa Rican singer
Eugenia Vargas, Chilean artist
Fred Vargas, French writer
Gabriel Vargas (disambiguation), list of people with the name
Jose Antonio Vargas, Filipino-American journalist
José María Vargas (historian), Ecuadorian friar and writer
Luis de Vargas (1502–1568), Spanish painter of the late-Renaissance period
Mario Vargas Llosa, Peruvian writer, politician and Nobel Prize laureate
Mary Belle de Vargas, American artist
Mónica Vargas Celis, Mexican film and television producer
Pedro Vargas, Mexican singer
Vania Vargas (born 1978), Guatemalan poet, narrator, editor, and journalist
Wilfrido Vargas, Dominican musician
Antonio Vargas Cortés, Spanish male flamenco singer

Politics
Alfred Vargas, Filipino politician and congressman of 5th district, Quezon City
Antonio Vargas, Ecuadorian politician
Cortés Vargas (1883–1954), Colombian general
Diego de Vargas, Spanish viceroy of New Spain
Dior Vargas American Latina feminist mental health activist
Francisco de Vargas, Paraguayan lawyer and minister
Getúlio Vargas (1882–1954), Brazilian president
José Augusto Vargas, Peruvian congressman
José María Vargas, Venezuelan president
Juan Vargas, United States politician
Julián García Vargas, Spanish politician
Miguel Vargas Maldonado, Dominican politician
Virgilio Barco Vargas, Colombian president

Sciences

Virginia Vargas (born 1945), Peruvian sociologist and women's movement leader

Sports

Akeem Vargas, German basketball player
Annerys Vargas, Dominican Republic volleyball player
Claudio Vargas, Vaqueros Laguna pitcher
Claudio David Vargas Villalba, Paraguayan footballer
Debbie Green-Vargas, women's volleyball setter
Eduardo Vargas, Chilean footballer
Eleucadia Vargas, Dominican Republic judoka
Fabián Andrés Vargas, Colombian footballer
Fernando Vargas, boxer
Freddy Vargas, Venezuelan road cyclist
Gonzalo Vargas, Uruguayan footballer
Gregorio Vargas, Mexican boxer
Gregory Vargas (born 1986), Venezuelan basketball player
Ildemaro Vargas (born 1991), Venezuelan baseball player
Jason Vargas, American baseball player
Juan Manuel Vargas, Peruvian footballer
Jefferson Vargas, Colombian road cyclist
Jorge Francisco Vargas, Chilean footballer
Kennys Vargas, Puerto Rican professional baseball player
Miguel Vargas (baseball), Cuban baseball player
Miguel Rodrigo Vargas, Portuguese footballer
Orestes Rodríguez Vargas, Peruvian and Spanish chess grandmaster
Óscar Vargas (cyclist), Colombian road cyclist
Nélson Vargas, Colombian road cyclist
Rodrigo Vargas (disambiguation)
Ronald Vargas, Venezuelan footballer
Ryan Vargas, American racing driver
Tetelo Vargas, Dominican Republic baseball player

Crime

Dorángel Vargas (born 1957), Venezuelan serial killer and cannibal 
Leonidas Vargas (1949–2009), Colombian drug lord
Nabor Vargas García (born 1976), Mexican drug lord

See also
Vargas (disambiguation)

References

Surnames of Spanish origin

bg:Варгас
br:Vargas